The presidency of Bongbong Marcos began at noon on June 30, 2022, following his inauguration as the 17th president of the Philippines, succeeding Rodrigo Duterte. His term is expected to end six years later, on June 30, 2028. 

Bongbong Marcos is the son of 10th president Ferdinand Marcos, who was in power from 1965 to 1986. He belongs to the prominent and controversial Marcos family.

Marcos assumed the presidency over the Philippines as the world was still struggling from the economic and social impact brought by the COVID-19 pandemic, and its negative effects were further amplified by the Russian invasion of Ukraine.

Marcos initiated the rightsizing of government bureaucracy, especially in the executive branch of the government. His administration oversaw the post-pandemic return to normalcy with the gradual reopening of the economy, return of face-to-face/physical classes, removal of stringent travel restrictions, and the lifting of the mask-wearing mandate for outdoor and indoor settings. The rising inflation and shortage of the country’s food supply were major challenges during the beginning of his presidency.

The Philippines ratified the RCEP on February 2023.

Election, transition, and inauguration

Marcos ran for president on a campaign platform centered on national unity and continuity of the policies of Rodrigo Duterte, his predecessor. He won the 2022 elections, receiving 31,629,783 (58.77%) votes out of a total of 56,097,722, beating his closest rival, Liberal Party member and Vice President Leni Robredo by over 15 million votes.

Marcos became the first candidate in the history of the Fifth Republic to win by a majority, scoring nearly 59 percent of the vote. His 31,629,783 votes was not only the highest count ever recorded in a presidential election, but close to the sum total of the two previous records combined.

Marcos' presidential transition began on May 25, 2022, when the Congress of the Philippines proclaimed his candidacy as the winner of the 2022 Philippine presidential election held on May 9, 2022.

Marcos was inaugurated as the seventeenth president of the Philippines on June 30, 2022, at the National Museum of Fine Arts. He was sworn in by Alexander Gesmundo, Chief Justice of the Supreme Court of the Philippines. The inaugural ceremony was notable for his meeting with outgoing president Rodrigo Duterte at the Malacañang Palace whose departure honors were also held at the complex, the military-civic parade, and his 25-minute speech that gives a view of what his presidency will look like.

Quirino Grandstand was the original venue for Marcos' inauguration. It was moved to the National Museum since the Manila COVID-19 Field Hospital still occupies the site at the time of the inauguration.

Major activities

Speeches

Inaugural Address (June 30, 2022)
First State of the Nation Address (July 25, 2022)

Major acts and legislation

Marcos has signed five bills into law, three of which are national in scope.

Executive issuances

Bongbong Marcos has signed a total of 19 executive orders, 179 proclamations, 4 administrative orders, 12 memorandum orders, 14 memorandum circulars, and one special order.

National budget

Leadership style
Marcos' leadership style was described by his press secretary Trixie Cruz-Angeles as being "more systematic and efficient", compared to his predecessor Rodrigo Duterte, who was driven by passion.

Administration and cabinet
Marcos began naming his Cabinet members on May 12, 2022. Following his presidential inauguration, he administered a mass oath-taking of his Cabinet officials.

First 100 days

During his first 100 days of presidency, Marcos focused on building the economy and the post-COVID-19 pandemic recovery. The Marcos administration faced challenges during this period such as a domestic sugar supply shortage in mid-2022, rising inflation rate brought about by the pandemic, and the economic effects of the Russian invasion of Ukraine.

The Marcos administration launched its COVID-19 booster shot campaign, PinasLakas, to administer booster doses to at least 23 million Filipinos during Marcos' first 100 days, but managed to boost only 3.5 million. Marcos issued an executive order allowing voluntary use of face masks in outdoor settings, and extended from September 13 to December 31, 2022, the period of the state of calamity declared by his predecessor, Rodrigo Duterte, due to the COVID-19.

The Marcos administration launched its anti-illegal drug campaign, Buhay Ingatan, Droga'y Ayawan (BIDA), which commits to continue the war on drugs "within the framework of the law and with respect for human rights and with focus on rehabilitation and socio-economic development".

Domestic affairs

Economy

The Philippines finally ratified the RCEP on February 21, 2023, the largest trade bloc in history.

Education

Marcos appointed his then-running mate and now Vice President Sara Duterte to concurrently serve as the Secretary of Education. Public schools in the Philippines started full in-person classes on November 2, 2022, after two years of hiatus due to the COVID-19 pandemic.

Gambling policy
In December 2022, Marcos issued an executive order formalizing former President Rodrigo Duterte's spoken order earlier that May to suspend e-sabong (online cockfighting) operations in the country.

Infrastructure

The Marcos administration will continue the Build! Build! Build! infrastructure program of his predecessor, Rodrigo Duterte. It was superseded by the Build, Better, More program, which added more infrastructure projects. The Marcos administration approved 194 infrastructure projects, with a total cost of PHP 9-trillion. It includes projects in public transport, physical connectivity, as well as water resources, digital connectivity, health, agriculture, and power. 77 of those project were carried from past administrations while 123 are “new and initiated” by the Marcos administration.

Public housing
The Marcos administration envisions to build 1 million housing units annually in order to address the country's backlog of 6.5 million housing units. 28 local government units (LGUs) have signed a memorandum of understanding with the DHSUD to pursue housing projects, with 11 of them already in the construction stage.

Transportation
The Marcos administration vows to improve the transportation system of the Philippines and has declared that it will pursue more projects. Marcos pursued the Public Utility Vehicle Modernization Program, which will phase out old traditional jeepneys and replace them with more modern public utility vehicles. It resulted in a weeklong nationwide transport strike in March 2023.

Telecommunications
In 2022, the Marcos administration launched the BroadBand ng Masa Program to provide internet in remote areas. To "boost government initiatives against scams committed through text and online messages", Marcos signed his first law, which mandated SIM card registration.

Foreign affairs

Marcos sought to continue his predecessor, Rodrigo Duterte's "friends to all, enemies to none" approach to foreign policy.

Marcos asserts that his administration does not intend for the Philippines to re-apply for International Criminal Court membership following the country's withdrawal from the international tribunal under his predecessor that took effect in March 2019.

China and the South China Sea

Marcos pledged to continue former president Duterte's policy of strengthening relations with China, whom he labeled the Philippines' "strongest partner." He favors a pacifist approach to resolving the territorial disputes in the South China Sea (West Philippine Sea), specifically "through diplomacy and dialogue." Marcos has urged his fellow ASEAN leaders to complete a code of conduct for the South China Sea in accordance with the United Nations Convention on the Law of the Sea and the Declaration on the Conduct of Parties in the South China Sea signed between ASEAN and China in 2002.

While campaigning for president in January 2022, Marcos committed to "set aside" Philippines v. China in favor of direct negotiations with the Chinese government over the disputes, stating that the Permanent Court of Arbitration ruling was "no longer available" to the Philippine government because China, among many other parties, had rejected it. However, following his election in May, then-president-elect Marcos declared that he would uphold Philippines v. China, vowing to invoke the ruling "to assert [the Philippines'] territorial rights" if and where necessary.

While addressing the Asia Society in New York City in September 2022, Marcos clarified that his country has "no territorial conflict with China" but rather, "China [is] claiming territory that belongs to the Philippines." He acknowledged the necessity of closer cooperation with his country's allies if the disputes escalated to war, as China's military capabilities are nearly 15 times "stronger" than the Philippines.

United States
Unlike Duterte, whose foreign policy lessened the country's dependence on the United States, Marcos sought to strengthen the Philippines' relations with its traditional ally.

Approval ratings

Protests

Mobilizations against Marcos' presidency have occurred as protests against historical distortion, human rights violations, and economic conditions.

Notes

References

 
Presidencies of the Philippines
Bongbong Marcos
2022 establishments in the Philippines
2020s in the Philippines
Marcos